Deborah Duen Ling Chung (professionally known as D.D.L. Chung) is an American scientist and university professor.

Early life and education
Chung was born and raised in Hong Kong. Her mother was Rebecca Chan Chung (United States World War II veteran with the Flying Tigers and the United States Army in China), whose mother was Lee Sun Chau (one of the first female doctors of Western Medicine in China).

Chung studied at Ying Wa Girls' School and King's College (Hong Kong).  She moved to the United States in 1970 and received a B.S. degree in Engineering and Applied Science and an M.S. degree in Engineering Science from California Institute of Technology (Caltech) in 1973.  At Caltech, she conducted research under the supervision of Pol Duwez. She, Sharon R. Long, Flora Wu and Stephanie Charles are the four first women to receive B.S. degrees from Caltech.

Chung received a Ph.D. degree in Materials Science from Massachusetts Institute of Technology in 1977.  Her thesis, which was on graphite intercalation compounds, was supervised by Mildred S. Dresselhaus.

Career and awards
In 1977, Chung joined the faculty of Carnegie Mellon University, where she taught materials science and electrical engineering.

In 1986, she joined the faculty of University at Buffalo, The State University of New York, where she directs the Composite Materials Research Laboratory and was named Niagara Mohawk Power Corporation Endowed Chair Professor in 1991. In 1991, she became Fellow of the American Carbon Society. In 1998, she became Fellow of ASM International (society). She received the Chancellor's Award for Excellence in Scholarship and Creative Activities from State University of New York in 2003 and was named Outstanding Inventor by State University of New York in 2002. In 1993, she was honored as "Teacher of the Year" by Tau Beta Pi (New York Nu). Chung was the first American woman and the first person of Chinese descent to receive the Charles E. Pettinos Award, in 2004; the award was in recognition of her work on functional carbons for thermal, electromagnetic and sensor applications. In 2005, she received the Hsun Lee Lecture Award from Institute of Metal Research, Chinese Academy of Sciences. In 2011, she received an Honorary Doctorate Degree from University of Alicante, Alicante, Spain. In addition, Chung received the Robert Lansing Hardy Gold Medal from American Institute of Mining, Metallurgical, and Petroleum Engineers (AIME) in 1980.

Scientific work

Scope
The main theme of Chung research is composite materials, with emphasis on multifunctional structural materials, materials for thermal management and electronic packaging, materials for electromagnetic interference shielding, structural materials for vibration damping, and structural materials for thermoelectricity. Chung invented "smart concrete" (concrete that can sense its own condition), nickel nanofiber (also known as nickel filament, for electromagnetic interference shielding) and conformable thermal paste (for improving thermal contacts, with applications in microelectronic cooling). Chung is highly productive in scientific research, with research funding provided mainly by the Federal government of the United States.

Scientific impact
A.	Pioneer and international leader in the field of multifunctional structural materials (without device incorporation), with the following specific contributions.

1.	Invention of smart (self-sensing) concrete and associated development of piezoresistivity-based strain sensing in cement-based and carbon fiber composites.

2.	Discovery of the function of the interlaminar interface in carbon fiber polymer-matrix composites as a sensor, thus enabling unprecedentedly high sensitivity to changes at this damage-prone interface.

3.	Development of the self-sensing in carbon fiber polymer-matrix composite beams under flexure by surface resistance measurement, with the strain at the tensile and compressive surfaces separately and sensitively determined, and with the piezoresisitivity mechanism elucidated.

4.	Development of capacitance-based self-sensing, with applications including 3D-printing monitoring (with unprecedented ability of sensing interlayer defects in the build).

5.	First report of structural capacitors (i.e., capacitors in the form of structural materials).

6.	Pioneering the emerging field of conductive dielectric materials, first determination of the electric permittivity of carbons and metals, and discovery of the application in electret-based self-powering (with self-charging capability), with the discovery allowing structures to be energy sources (a new untapped source of energy), and with elucidation of the dielectric behavior in terms of the carrier-atom interaction (carrier meaning the mobile charges).

7.	Discovery of interface-derived viscoelasticity and the consequent development of structural materials that are effective for vibration damping.

B.	Pioneer and international leader in the field of thermal interface materials for microelectronic cooling, with the following specific contributions.

1.	Changing the paradigm of the design of thermal interface materials from thermal-conductivity-based design to conformability-based design, thereby resulting in the development of superior but low-cost thermal interface materials that excel due to conformability.

2.	Development of highly effective thermal pastes with conformable solid components.

C.	Pioneer and international leader in the field of materials for electromagnetic interference (EMI) shielding, with the following specific contributions.

1.	Changing the paradigm of the design of EMI shielding materials from electrical-conductivity-based design to interface-area-based design, thereby resulting in the development of a highly effective EMI shielding material in the form of nickel-coated carbon nanofiber (originally known as nickel filament).

2.	Discovery of absorption-dominated EMI shielding in metals, the shielding of which has long been assumed to be dominated by reflection.

3.	Discovery of unusually high EMI shielding effectiveness in exfoliated-graphite-based flexible graphite sheets, which are valuable for EMI gasketing.

4.	Development of radio-wave reflective concrete and its application in automobile lateral guidance.

Books
Chung is the author of "Carbon Materials", World Scientific, 2018,Carbon Composites, 2nd Edition, Elsevier, 2016, Functional Materials, World Scientific, 2nd Ed., 2021 and Composite Materials: Science and Applications, 2nd Edition, Springer, 2010. She is the Editor of two book series, The Road to Scientific Success and Engineering Materials for Technological Needs.

Professional leadership
According to the 2022 Stanford University publication/citation-based ranking of all researchers in the world (living/deceased) for all disciplines, Chung is ranked No. 13 among 315,721 researchers in the world with Materials as the primary discipline; if only the living researchers are counted, Chung is ranked No. 10 in the world;  if only women are counted, Chung is ranked No. 1 in the world; if only researchers of Chinese descent are counted, Chung is ranked No. 1 in the world. Among the researchers in University at Buffalo, The State University of New York, for all disciplines combined, Chung is ranked No. 1.

Chung is among 100 scientists featured in the book Successful Women Ceramic and Glass Scientists and Engineers: 100 Inspirational Profiles. She has been interviewed by the news media concerning various scientific topics including conductive concrete for melting snow, smart concrete, and batteries.

Chung is Executive Guest Editor for the Special Issue on "Amorphous and Nanocrystalline Carbon Films: Development and Applications" of the journal Materials Chemistry and Physics, dedicated to the memory of Professor Mildred S. Dresselhaus, Associate Editor of the Journal of Electronic Materials, and is a member of the Editorial Board of the Carbon journal, a member of the Editorial Board of the New Carbon Materials journal, and an Editor of Carbon Letters. She is also a member of the Editorial Board of "Materials Chemistry and Physics" journal, "Functional Composite Materials" journal, and "Polymer and Polymer Composites" journal. She also served as the Chair of the 21st Biennial Conference on Carbon held in Buffalo, New York, in 1993. Moreover, she was a member of the Advisory Committee of the American Carbon Society. In addition, Chung serves as a reviewer for a large number of scientific research journals. Recent work at the National Academies includes serving as a member of the Panel on Review of In-house Laboratory Independent Research in Materials Sciences at the Army’s Research, Development, and Engineering Centers in 2018-19.

Patents
Chung is the inventor in numerous issued patents related to cement, carbon, ceramics and composites. Recent patents include the following.

D.D.L. Chung, "Cement-based material systems and method for self-sensing and weighing”, U.S. Patent 10,620,062 B2.

D.D.L. Chung, "Systems and method for monitoring three-dimensional printing", U.S. Patent 10449721.

D.D.L. Chung, "Thixotropic liquid-metal-based fluid and its use in making metal-based structures with or without a mold", U.S. Patent 9993996 B2; China Patent CN 105458254A; Hong Kong patent pending

D.D.L. Chung and Xiaoqing Gao, "Microstructured high-temperature hybrid material, its composite material and method of making", U.S. Patent 9409823.

D.D.L. Chung and Sivaraja Muthusamy, "Cement-Graphite Composite Materials for Vibration Damping", U.S. Patent 8,211,227 (2012).

D.D.L. Chung, "Electrically conductive electret and associated electret-based power source and self-powered structure”, U.S. Patent 11081285 (Aug. 3, 2021).

Research journal publications
Chung's scientific publications have been highly cited. 
Google Scholar: h-index = 109, 42946 citations, annual citations reaching 3150.
Web of Science: h-index = 82, 26044 citations, annual citations reaching ~2200.

Chung's scientific journal publications since 2016 are listed below.
D.D.L. Chung. First review of capacitance-based self-sensing in structural materials. Sensors Actuators A 354, 114270 (2023). 
D.D.L. Chung, Dang Q. Duong. New method of measuring the permittivity of silicon wafer, with relevance to permittivity-based quality sensing, Mater. Chem. Phys. 299, 127516 (2023). 
D.D.L. Chung. A review to elucidate the multi-faceted science of the electrical-resistance-based strain /temperature/damage self-sensing in continuous carbon fiber polymer-matrix structural composites. J. Mater. Sci. 58, 483–526 (2023).
D.D.L. Chung, Dang Q. Duong. Observation of electric polarization continuity in graphite. Mater. Chem. Phys. 297, 127357 (2023).
D.D.L. Chung, Xiang Xi. New concept of electret-based capacitance, as shown for solder and other conductors. J. Mater. Sci.: Materials in Electronics 33, 27022-27039 (2022). 
D.D.L. Chung. A critical review of electrical-resistance-based self-sensing in conductive cement-based materials. Carbon 203, 311-325 (2023).   
D.D.L. Chung. Pitfalls in piezoresistivity testing. J. Electronic Mater. 51, 5473-5481 (2022). 
Xiang Xi and D.D.L. Chung. Pyropermittivity as an emerging method of thermal analysis, with application to carbon fibers. J. Thermal Analysis and Calorimetry 147, 10267-10283 (2022).  
Murat Ozturk and D.D.L. Chung. Capacitance-based stress self-sensing in asphalt without electrically conductive constituents, with relevance to smart pavements. Sensors and Actuators A 342, 113625 (2022).
D.D.L. Chung. Pitfalls in electromagnetic skin-depth determination. J. Electron. Mater. 51, 1893-1899 (2022).  
D.D.L. Chung. Performance of thermal interface materials. Small 18(16), 2200693 (2022). 
 D.D.L. Chung and Murat Ozturk. Electromagnetic skin depth of cement paste and its thickness dependence. J. Building Eng. 52, 104393 (2022).

Teaching
Chung is a dedicated teacher of materials science both in the classroom and in the research laboratory. Her courses include Principles of Material Design, Experimental Methods in Materials Science and Engineering and Smart Materials. Most of her research has involved graduate students, but she also supervises undergraduate research. Graduate students involved in authoring the above recent publications are Po-Hsiu Chen, Andi Wang, Yoshihiro Takizawa, Xinghua Hong, Asma A. Eddib, Min Wang, Ailipati Delixiati, Alexander S. Haddad, Xiang Xi and Wenyi Yang.  Undergraduate students involved in authoring the above recent publications are Patatri Chakraborty, Sanjaya Somaratna, Miguel Ramirez and Chi Xu. In addition, Chung shares her life experience with students.

Historical work
Chung is a co-author of the book Piloted to Serve, an autobiography of her mother, Rebecca Chan Chung (1920-2011), a nurse with the Flying Tigers, United States Army and China National Aviation Corporation during World War II.
Chung's historical work pertains to modern Chinese history, as centered around her mother Rebecca Chan Chung and grandmother Lee Sun Chau (1890-1979).  Chau was one of the earliest Chinese female doctors of Western Medicine in China.

Speaking
Chung speaks broadly on topics related to science and history. She gave the Inaugural Millie Dresselhaus Memorial Lecture at MIT on May 9, 2022. Selected lectures are featured on YouTube, including an English channel  and a Chinese channel. The venues include conferences, universities, and community events.  Recent keynote/plenary lecture engagements include the 2017 International Carbon Conference held in Sydney, Australia. and the 2021 Turkish 3rd National Carbon Conference.

References

External links
Dr. Chung's Research Laboratory Web Site

1952 births
California Institute of Technology alumni
Carnegie Mellon University faculty
Alumni of King's College, Hong Kong
Hong Kong emigrants to the United States
Living people
MIT School of Engineering alumni
American materials scientists
Carbon scientists
People from East Amherst, New York
Scientists from New York (state)
University at Buffalo faculty